Orangeburg County Fair Main Exhibit Building is a historic county fair  exhibition hall and grandstand located at Orangeburg, Orangeburg County, South Carolina. It was built in 1911, and is a one-story, rectangular, frame building.  It sits on an open, brick pier foundation and has shiplap siding and a low-pitched gable roof.

It was added to the National Register of Historic Places in 1985.

References

Event venues on the National Register of Historic Places in South Carolina
Buildings and structures completed in 1911
Buildings and structures in Orangeburg County, South Carolina
National Register of Historic Places in Orangeburg County, South Carolina